The dihedral angles for the edge-transitive polyhedra are:

References 
 Coxeter, Regular Polytopes (1963), Macmillan Company
 Regular Polytopes, (3rd edition, 1973), Dover edition,  (Table I: Regular Polytopes, (i) The nine regular polyhedra {p,q} in ordinary space)
  (Section 3-7 to 3-9)
 

Polyhedra